Sir Douglas Jardine Flint,  (born 8 July 1955) is a British banker and former Group Chairman of HSBC Holdings. He served from 2011 to 2017, having previously been Group Finance Director since 1995. He currently serves as chairman of Abrdn.

Biography

Education 
Flint graduated with a bachelor's degree with honours in Accounting from the University of Glasgow. He also completed the PMD course at Harvard Business School in 1983. Flint is a member of a number of professional bodies such as the Institute of Chartered Accountants of Scotland, the British Association of Corporate Treasurers professional body and most recently, Institute of International Finance, where he now serves as chairman of the board. He is also a Fellow of the Chartered Institute of Management Accountants.

Career 
Flint started his career in Peat Marwick Mitchell & Co. (now KPMG), and was appointed a partner of the firm in 1988. He became Group Finance Director of HSBC in 1995. He was the Chairman of the Financial Reporting Council's review of the Turnbull Guidance on Internal Control from 2004 to 2005 and was a member of The Accounting Standards Board and the Standards Advisory Council of the International Accounting Standards Committee Foundation from 2001 to 2004.

In June 2006, in recognition to his services to the finance industry, he was appointed a CBE (Commander of the Order of the British Empire).

Flint became group chairman of HSBC at the end of 2010.

He became Chairman of IP Group in November 2018. In October 2018 it was announced that he would become the new chairman of Standard Life Aberdeen on 1 January 2019, succeeding Sir Gerry Grimstone.

References

External links 
HSBC director's profile

1955 births
Scottish chairpersons of corporations
Living people
Chairmen of HSBC
Scottish businesspeople
Scottish bankers
Scottish accountants
Alumni of the University of Glasgow
Harvard Business School alumni
British corporate directors
Businesspeople from Glasgow
Commanders of the Order of the British Empire
Knights Bachelor
Businesspeople awarded knighthoods